Kyron McMaster (born 3 January 1997) is an athlete from the British Virgin Islands specialising in the 400 metres hurdles.

He represented his country at the 2017 World Championships where he finished in the top three in his heat only to be disqualified for a lane infringement. Earlier, he won a bronze medal at the 2016 World U20 Championships.

His personal best in the event is 47.08 seconds set in finishing fourth in the final of the 2020 Olympic Games 400m hurdles, on August 3, 2021. This is the current national record.

His coach, Xavier "Dag" Samuels died on September 9, 2017 during Hurricane Irma.

McMaster won the British Virgin Islands' first ever Commonwealth Games medal (a gold) in the 400 m hurdles in 2018 and followed up with another gold at the Commonwealth Games winning at Birmingham 2022 in the same event.

International competitions

1Did not finish in the final
2Did not start in the semifinals

References

1997 births
Living people
British Virgin Islands male hurdlers
World Athletics Championships athletes for British Virgin Islands
Athletes (track and field) at the 2014 Summer Youth Olympics
Commonwealth Games gold medallists for the British Virgin Islands
Commonwealth Games medallists in athletics
Athletes (track and field) at the 2018 Commonwealth Games
People from Road Town
Central American and Caribbean Games gold medalists for the British Virgin Islands
Competitors at the 2018 Central American and Caribbean Games
Diamond League winners
Florida Gators men's track and field athletes
Commonwealth Games gold medallists in athletics
Central American and Caribbean Games medalists in athletics
Athletes (track and field) at the 2020 Summer Olympics
Olympic athletes of the British Virgin Islands
Medallists at the 2018 Commonwealth Games